Horner may refer to:

People
 Someone from the Horn of Africa
 Horner (surname)

Places
Horner, Somerset, England, UK
Horner Avenue, Alderwood, Toronto, Ontario, Canada
River Horner, Somerset, England, UK; a river also known as Horner Water
Horner Nunatak, Antarctica; a nunatak
Horner site, Wyoming, USA; an archaeological site

Facilities and structures
Horner Junior High School, a school in Fremont, California, USA
Franklin Horner Middle School, a school in Alderwood, Toronto, Ontario, Canada
Horner Institute (1902-1913) a private school in Missouri, USA
 Horner Museum, Gill Coliseum, Oregon State University, Corvallis, Oregon, USA
 Horner Ballpark, Dallas, Texas, USA; a ballpark
 Horner Rennbahn, Horn, Hamburg, Germany; a racehorse circuit

Other uses
 Horner's syndrome (Horner's) a neurological disease
 , a U.S. Navy ship name
 Governor Horner State Memorial, Chicago, Illinois, USA

See also

 
 Horner's method (mathematics)
 Little Jack Horner, a nursery rhyme
 Cape Horner, a ship capable of rounding Cape Horn
 Horner sign (disambiguation)
 Horner House (disambiguation)
 Horn (disambiguation)